A referendum ratifying the constitution of the French consulate was held in February 1800. 53.74% of voters abstained. The official results, as announced by Lucien Bonaparte, Minister of the Interior and brother of First Consul Napoleon Bonaparte, were 99.9% in favor of the new constitution. However, academics have claimed that Lucien massaged the votes in favor of the constitution, alleging that only 1,550,000 Frenchmen voted for the change.

Results

References

1800 in France
1800 referendums
Referendums in France
Constitutional referendums in France
January 1800 events
French Consulate
1800 elections in France